Daytona 250 may refer to:

NextEra Energy Resources 250, a NASCAR Camping World Truck Series race at Daytona International Speedway
Brumos Porsche 250, a Grand American Road Racing Association Rolex Sports Car Series race at Daytona International Speedway